Gabriel Nunes da Cunha (born July 11, 1994), known as Gabriel Nunes, is a Brazilian footballer who plays as midfielder for Italian  club Casertana.

Club career
On 26 February 2020, he signed with Italian Serie C club Padova until the end of the 2019–20 season, with the club holding an option to renew the contract.

On 7 July 2022, Nunes moved to Casertana in Serie D.

Career statistics

References

External links

Gabriel Nunes at ZeroZero

1994 births
Living people
People from Andradina
Footballers from São Paulo (state)
Brazilian footballers
Association football forwards
Campeonato Brasileiro Série B players
Campeonato Brasileiro Série D players
ABC Futebol Clube players
Botafogo Futebol Clube (SP) players
Sertãozinho Futebol Clube players
Paulista Futebol Clube players
Grêmio Osasco Audax Esporte Clube players
Clube Atlético Bragantino players
Capivariano Futebol Clube players
América Futebol Clube (RN) players
Primeira Liga players
Boavista F.C. players
Serie C players
Serie D players
Calcio Padova players
A.C.N. Siena 1904 players
A.C. Trento 1921 players
Casertana F.C. players
Brazilian expatriate footballers
Brazilian expatriate sportspeople in Portugal
Brazilian expatriate sportspeople in Italy
Expatriate footballers in Portugal
Expatriate footballers in Italy